Strike is an Australian film directed by George Young. It is considered a lost film.

Plot
A foreigner, Von Haeke, seduces a mine-owner's daughter in order to gain access to her house and her father's money. He is about to marry the girl when his deserted wife arrives and exposes him. In revenge, Von Haeke induces the miners to go on strike, abducts the gig and imprisons her in a mineshaft which is flooded. The hero, Jack, arrives in time to save the girl and beats Von Haeke in a fight. Von Haeke falls to his death from a cliff and Jack marries the girl.

Production
Part of the movie was shot in a coal mine in southern New South Wales in January 1912.

Release
The movie was advertised as being "suggested by the well-known author" Casper Middleton. It only received a limited release in Sydney.

References

External links
 

1912 films
Australian black-and-white films
Australian silent short films
Lost Australian films